Ihor Myronovych Yeremeyev (3 April 1968 – 12 August 2015) was a Ukrainian politician, People's Deputy of Ukraine of the 4th, 7th and 8th convocation (non-partisan, Chairman of the Deputy Group "People's Will"). He was a co-owner of a Ukrainian fuel station network WOG.

Biography
He was born in 1968 at Ostrozhets in the Mlyniv Raion of Rivne Oblast, in what was the Ukrainian SSR of the Soviet Union. 

In 1992, uniting the group of comrades from his institute, created a private enterprise "Continuum" in his native village and became its director. 

In 2002, he was elected to the Verkhovna Rada after winning a single-member districts seat as a member of the Agrarian Party of Ukraine in Manevychi. In December 2010, he ranked 41st on the Kyiv Post'''s list of the richest people in Ukraine. In the 2012 Ukrainian parliamentary election and 2014 Ukrainian parliamentary election, he was elected back into parliament as a non-partisan candidate again after winning the single-member districts seat of Manevychi. He was the founder and head of the parliamentary group People's Will since its foundation on 27 February 2014 (until 27 November 2014 this group was called Sovereign European Ukraine'').

In January 2014, during the voting for the so-called "dictatorial laws", his vote was counted as "for", but within a week he submitted an application with a request to consider the result of his vote "did not vote" and by participating in the preparation of a bill to repeal the said laws.

On 26 July 2015, he received a head injury during a horse-riding accident in Lutsk, Ukraine. He died on 12 August 2015 while in a coma in a hospital in Zurich, Switzerland afterwards.

References

External links
 Official website of Ihor Yeremeyev 

1968 births
2015 deaths
People from Rivne Oblast
Ukrainian businesspeople in the oil industry
Fourth convocation members of the Verkhovna Rada
Seventh convocation members of the Verkhovna Rada
Eighth convocation members of the Verkhovna Rada
Deaths by horse-riding accident